New York's 10th State Senate district is one of 63 districts in the New York State Senate. It has  been represented by Democrat James Sanders Jr. since 2013, following his defeat of incumbent Shirley Huntley in the 2012 Democratic primary election.

Geography
District 10 is located in Southeast Queens, including the neighborhoods of Laurelton, Rosedale, Springfield Gardens, Edgemere, Bayswater, Arverne, and Far Rockaway, as well as the John F. Kennedy International Airport.

The district overlaps with New York's 5th, 6th, and 7th congressional districts, and with the 23rd, 24th, 28th, 29th, 31st, 32nd, and 38th districts of the New York State Assembly.

Recent election results

2020

2018

2016

2014

2012

Federal results in District 10

References

10